Ember Glance: The Permanence of Memory is effectively the soundtrack of a collaboration between David Sylvian and Russell Mills. 
The pieces were written to accompany an installation of sculpture and experimental exhibitions, conceived and produced by national and international artists at the invitation of Tokyo Creative '90, staged at the "Space FGO-Soko" in the Temporary Museum, Tokyo Bay, Shinagawa, which ran from 29 September to 12 October 1990.
Accompanying the album is a catalog/book of 96 pages which chronicles the entire installation as well as biographical history of both artists about the installation. The music is ambient and moody and consists of two instrumental tracks. Both tracks are available on the 1999 Sylvian ambient compilation Approaching Silence.

Track listing
"The Beekeeper's Apprentice" (Sylvian, Perry) 32:52
"Epiphany" (Sylvian) 2:24

Personnel
David Sylvian – instruments, engineer, sound, lights (exhibition), installation concept and creation
Russell Mills – box design, sound, lights (exhibition), installation concept and creation
Noel Harris – engineer
Frank Perry – Noan bells, bowed Gong, Finger bells

Additional personnel and exhibition's personnel
Yuka Fujii – project co-ordinator (for Opium Arts)
Richard Chadwick, Natasha White – co-ordinating assistants
David Buckland – photographic treatments and advisors
Ian Walton – enclosure canvas and installation collaboration
Kendall Wrightson – technical advisor, assistant
Kiyofumi Terui – installation construction supervisor
Miki Maeda – lighting
Yoshihide Murao – sound
Naoki Tachiwaka – producer
Yasuaki Kujuro – co-producer
Shigenori Kashimura, Tsutomu Mori – project co-ordinators (Japan)
Kunihoko Yoshimeki – sponsorship (for Tokyo Creative)

References

External links
 Exhibition unofficial site

David Sylvian albums
1991 albums
Virgin Records albums